The Chamberlain's Brook Formation is a thin but distinctive geologic formation of dark red calcareous mudstones that crops out from Rhode Island to Massachusetts and, Nova Scotia, New Brunswick and Newfoundland. It preserves fossils, including trilobites, dating back to the lower mid-Cambrian period.  Its lowermost member is the Braintree Member (lowest Middle Cambrian) and the uppermost member is the Fossil Brook Member.

See also 
 List of fossiliferous stratigraphic units in Massachusetts
 Paleontology in Massachusetts

References 

 

Geologic formations of Rhode Island
Geologic formations of Massachusetts
Geology of Nova Scotia
Geologic formations of New Brunswick
Geology of Newfoundland and Labrador
Cambrian System of North America
Cambrian Massachusetts
Cambrian southern paleotemperate deposits
Cambrian south paleopolar deposits